is a Japanese hurdler. She competed in the women's 100 metres hurdles at the 2017 World Championships in Athletics.

Personal bests

National university record holder

International competition

National titles
Japanese Championships
100 m hurdles: 2013, 2015
4 × 100 m relay: 2020
4 × 400 m relay: 2020

Notes

References

External links
 
 
 Hitomi Shimura at Toho Bank 

1990 births
Living people
Sportspeople from Saga Prefecture
Japanese female hurdlers
Asian Games competitors for Japan
Athletes (track and field) at the 2018 Asian Games
World Athletics Championships athletes for Japan
Japan Championships in Athletics winners
Waseda University alumni
21st-century Japanese women